John Rowe (born January 1941) is a British actor. 

After reading English at Oxford he worked as a teacher before training at the Birmingham School of Speech and Drama. After some years in repertory theatre he joined the BBC Radio Drama Company at Broadcasting House and has been a prolific radio actor ever since, notably as Professor Jim Lloyd in The Archers. He has also played numerous character roles on television and film and his extensive stage work includes touring with the Old Vic in Europe, China, the Middle East and Australia.

Filmography

Film
The Chain (1984)
Clockwise (1986)
The Heart of Me (2001)
Lagaan (2001)
The Lost Prince (2003)
Victoria & Abdul (2017)

TV
BBC Television Shakespeare - Henry VIII (Cromwell, 1979)
BBC Television Shakespeare - Macbeth (Lennox, 1983)
Juliet Bravo (1980–85)
When the Boat Comes In (Hector Smith-Jameson, 1981)
Chambers (Judge Riseby, 1990)
Agatha Christie's Poirot (The Cornish Mystery, 1990)
Seekers (1992)
Trial & Retribution (2006)
Law & Order: UK (series 5) (2011)
Casualty (2013)
Mr Selfridge (2015)
BBC Television - Holby City Series 18, Episode 24: Who You Are (Thomas Bell Humphries, 2016)
Vera (TV series) (2016 - episode: The Moth Catcher)
The Crown (2016)

Radio

References

External links

John Rowe's Radio performances

Living people
British male stage actors
British male film actors
British male television actors
Audiobook narrators
1940 births